The Bryan Autoplanes were a series of three experimental roadable aircraft.

Development
Leland Bryan built his roadable aircraft in the town of Milford, Michigan. As a roadable aircraft the aircraft was required to be registered by both the Civil Aeronautics Administration (CAA) and the Michigan Motor Vehicle Administration (MMVA), with road propulsion provided by propeller thrust.

Design
The Bryan Model I was built with a welded steel tube fuselage frame, wings from a Briegleb BG-6 primary glider and a Crosley automobile engine, which was later replaced by a 40 hp Continental.

The Model II autoplane featured an extended Erco Ercoupe center-section, with a pusher engine at the rear of the fuselage nacelle, with twin tail booms supporting the tail section. The Ercoupe landing gear was used for the roadable operations, reaching up to 60 mph on the road. For storage and road transport the wings folded at two hinge lines.

Operational history
The Model I was approved for limited flight, in the experimental category. by the CAA, managing to accumulate 500 miles of road driving, and flying for the first time in 1953. The improved Model II achieved 80 hours of flight time and 4000 miles of road travel before a road accident. During repairs the Model II was rebuilt with two-seats becoming the Model III Autoplane, with a Continental A75 engine and convertible top motors, from a Chevrolet Corvair, to extend and fold the wings. After accumulating 70 hours of flight time and 1000 road miles, the Model III crashed during a flyby at the 1974 Experimental Aircraft Association (EAA) airshow, at Oshkosh, Wisconsin, when an inadequately secured wing section parted company killing the designer. At the time of his death Leland Bryan was in the process of designing the Model IV Autoplane, based on a Rutan VariViggen.

Variants
Bryan Special
Alternative name for the Bryan Model I
Bryan Model I Autoplane
entered flight test in 1953
Bryan Model II Autoplane
1957 based on an Ercoupe fuselage with a double articulating wing.
Bryan Model III Autoplane
1970 a rebuild of the model II with single hinged wing articulation.
Bryan Model IV Autoplane

Specifications (Model II)

Notes

References

Roadable aircraft
Aircraft first flown in 1953
Single-engined pusher aircraft
1950s United States civil utility aircraft
Twin-boom aircraft